Voices of Kidnapping is a Canadian short documentary film, directed by Ryan McKenna and released in 2017. The film profiles Voces Del Secuestro, a long-running radio show in Colombia which allows people to send messages to family members who have been kidnapped by the Revolutionary Armed Forces of Colombia.

In 2019, the film received a Canadian Screen Award nomination for Best Short Documentary at the 7th Canadian Screen Awards.

References

External links

2017 films
2017 short documentary films
Canadian short documentary films
Films shot in Colombia
Spanish-language Canadian films
2010s Canadian films